2014–15 Eerste Klasse was a Dutch association football season of the Eerste Klasse.

Saturday champions were:
 SVL Langbroek
 Sportlust '46
 SV Heinenoord
 DOS '37
 HZVV

Sunday champions were:
 VV De Meern
 RKAVV
 RKSV Halsteren
 EHC Hoensbroek
 VV Alverna
 Dieze West

Eerste Klasse seasons
Eerste Klasse